Developed by Calvin S. Hall, the open field test is an experimental test used to assay general locomotor activity levels, anxiety, and willingness to explore in animals (usually rodents) in scientific research. However, the extent to which behavior in the open field measures anxiety is controversial. The open field test can be used to assess memory by evaluating the ability of the animal to recognize a stimuli or object. Another animal test that is used to assess memory using that same concept is the novel object recognition test.

Concept
Animals such as rats and mice display a natural aversion to brightly lit open areas. However, they also have a drive to explore a perceived threatening stimulus. Decreased levels of anxiety lead to increased exploratory behavior. Increased anxiety will result in less locomotion and a preference to stay close to the walls of the field (thigmotaxis).

Experimental design 

The open field is an arena with walls to prevent escape. Commonly, the field is marked with a grid and square crossings. The center of the field is marked with a different color to differentiate from the other squares. In the modern open field apparatus, infrared beams or video cameras with associated software can be used to automate the assessment process.

Behavioral patterns measured in the open field test include:

 Line crossings – Frequency with which the rodent crosses grid lines with all four paws (a measure of locomotor activity), sometimes divided into activity near the wall and activity in the center.
 Center square entries – Frequency with which the rodent enters the center square with all four paws.
 Center square duration – Duration of time spent in the central square.
 Rearing – Frequency with which the rodent stands on its hind legs in the field. Rearing-up behavior in which the forepaws of the animal are unsupported and the similar behavior in which the forepaws rest against the walls of the enclosure have different underlying genetic and neural mechanisms and unsupported rearing might be a more direct measure of anxiety.
 Stretch attend postures – Frequency with which rodent demonstrated forward elongation of the head and shoulders followed by retraction to the original position. High frequency indicates high levels of anxiety. 
 Defecation and urination – The frequency of defecation and urination is controversial. Some scientists argue that increase in defecation shows increased anxiety. Other scientists disagree and state that defecation and urination show signs of emotionality but cannot be assumed to be anxiety.

Criticisms
The assumption that the test is based on conflict has been heavily criticized. Critics point out that when measuring anxiety each choice should have both positive and negative outcomes. This leads to more dependable observations which the OFT does not present.

When the test was first developed, it was pharmacologically validated through the use of benzodiazepines, a common anxiety medication. Newer drugs such as 5-HT-1A partial agonists and selective serotonin reuptake inhibitors, which have also been proven to treat anxiety, show inconsistent results in this test.

Due to the idiopathic nature of anxiety, animal models have flaws that cannot be controlled. Because of this it is better to do the open field test in conjuncture with other tests such as the elevated plus maze and light-dark box test.

Different results can be obtained depending on the strain of the animal. Different equipment and grid lines may cause different results.

See also 
 Animal models of depression
 Forced swim test
 Hole-board test
 Tail suspension test

References 

Animal testing techniques
Psychology experiments